Charles Milton Cunningham (April 2, 1877 – May 17, 1936) was a Louisiana attorney and newspaper publisher who served as a Democratic member of the Louisiana State Senate from 1915 to 1922.  
 
Born in New Orleans, Louisiana, Cunningham received his undergraduate degree from Northwestern State University, taught briefly, and established The Natchitoches Times newspaper in 1903. He studied law, and was an unsuccessful candidate for a district judgeship in 1906.

References

 

1877 births
1936 deaths
Politicians from New Orleans
Politicians from Natchitoches, Louisiana
Northwestern State University alumni
American newspaper publishers (people)
Democratic Party Louisiana state senators
Parish jurors and commissioners in Louisiana
American Roman Catholics
Lawyers from New Orleans
Catholics from Louisiana
Educators from Louisiana